Tucma may refer to:
 a synonym for Ennealophus, a flowering plant genus
 Tucma (fly), a fly genus in the family Sphaeroceridae